Blepharocalyx is a genus of plant in family Myrtaceae first described as a genus in 1854. It is native to South America and the West Indies.

Accepted species
 Blepharocalyx cruckshanksii (Hook. & Arn.) Nied. - Chile
 Blepharocalyx eggersii (Kiaerskou) L.R.Landrum - Lesser Antilles, Venezuela, Guyana, Peru, Brazil 
 Blepharocalyx myriophyllus  Mattos - Minas Gerais
 Blepharocalyx salicifolius (Kunth.) O.Berg - Brazil, Bolivia, Peru, Ecuador, Paraguay, Uruguay, N Argentina

References

 
Myrtaceae genera
Taxonomy articles created by Polbot
Neotropical realm flora